TekWar is a series of science fiction novels created by Canadian actor William Shatner and ghost-written by American writer Ron Goulart, published by Putnam beginning in October 1989. The novels gave rise to a comic book series, video game, and later TV movies and a series, both of the latter featuring Shatner.

Premise
The 22nd century universe is centered on "Tek"—an illegal, addictive, mind-altering digital drug in the form of a microchip. The drug creates a simulated reality (and in the films and TV series taps into "the matrix" hyperspace).  In the later novels, a new version called "SuperTek" has improved efficiency, is less likely to cause brain damage in users, and features a shared reality, similar to the TV versions "matrix".  The protagonist, Jake Cardigan, is a former police officer framed for dealing the drug four years prior to the start of the first novel. Having been sentenced to 15 years' cryo-imprisonment, his release is brought forward by Walt Bascom, the head of private investigation agency Cosmos, who has uncovered the framed charges and exonerates him.  In return Bascom wishes to employ him as an expert in a series of Tek-related crimes, mostly in Greater Los Angeles, referred to as "GLA".  In the first few novels Cardigan is portrayed as a recovering Tek-user with several lapses, but this aspect diminishes as the novels progress - it is implied in later novels that to break the addiction for even a light user is impossible.

Partnered with the good-natured and charismatic Mexican Sid Gomez, the two make up a good cop/bad cop partnership with Cardigan's past continually being brought up as a foil for his new career - most honest people he meets distrust him, and most dishonest people attempt to kill him for perceived slights in the drug trade.  However, the two prove an effective team and stay a core duo throughout the series, with input from a comprehensive list of informants, employees of both Cosmos, other detective agencies and Cardigan's son Dan and his girlfriend Molly - both of whom are enrolled in the GLA police academy and as such have access through their own informant to police files.

The 22nd century is populated with artificial intelligence such as integrated computer systems and  "andies" which range from obvious metal robots to highly sophisticated simulacrums, some of which are accurate enough to deceive an observer into thinking they are human.

Each novel covers a specific case, all are Tek-related, but most include sub-plots which involve non-Tek issues and travel out of the GLA, occasionally to other countries or as far as orbiting satellites.  A shadowy government agency known as OCO - the Office of Clandestine Operations - is a frequent antagonist in the novels, albeit usually keeping to the background and supporting the particular novel's villain.

Background
Shatner began to write notes that would become the novels on the set of Star Trek V: The Final Frontier, and has been quoted as saying that the original book was an attempt to blend elements from Star Trek and T. J. Hooker.

Novels
TekWar (1989) 
TekLords (1991) 
TekLab (1991) 
Tek Vengeance (1993) 
Tek Secret (1993) 
Tek Power (1994) 
Tek Money (1995) 
Tek Kill (1996) 
Tek Net (1997)

Comic book series

In 1992, Tekwar was adapted in to a comic book series.

A new Tekwar comic book adaptation, entitled The Tek War Chronicles, by Shatner and comic book writer Scott Davis with art by Erich Owen and colors by Michelle Davies, was released by Bluewater Productions on June 24, 2009. As of 2010, Tek War Chronicles is available digitally exclusively through Devil's Due Digital.

Trading cards
Trading cards with comic book artwork were published by Cardz in 1993.

Television films and series

The TekWar novels became a television franchise with TV films in 1994, then a series.

The first three were adaptations of the books, while TekJustice was an original movie.

Adult animated adaptation 
An adult animated adaptation/reboot of TekWar was announced in September 2021. The project will be developed and written by Matt Michnovetz and produced by Pure Imagination Studios with Shatner's Shatner Universe.

Video game

Tekwar was also made into a 1995 computer game by Capstone Software using the Build engine.

References

1989 novels
Science fiction book series
Novels by William Shatner
Science fiction franchises
Novels set in the 22nd century
American novels adapted into films
Novels adapted into comics
American novels adapted into television shows
Novels adapted into video games
Novels about drugs
Novels about technology